Mytishchinsky District is an administrative and municipal district (raion), one of the thirty-six in Moscow Oblast, Russia. It is located in the center of the oblast just north of the federal city of Moscow. Its administrative center is the city of Mytishchi. As of the 2010 Census, the total population of the district was 203,393, with the population of Mytishchi accounting for 85.1% of that number.

Notable residents 

Nina Doroshina (1934—2018), actress, People's Artist of the RSFSR (1985)

References

Notes

Sources

 
Districts of Moscow Oblast